This is a list of Australian films during the 2020s decade: from 2020 to 2029. For a complete alphabetical list, see :Category:Australian films.

2020
List of Australian films of 2020

2021
List of Australian films of 2021

2022
List of Australian films of 2022

2023
List of Australian films of 2023

2024
List of Australian films of 2024

2025
List of Australian films of 2025

2026
List of Australian films of 2026

2027
List of Australian films of 2027

2028
List of Australian films of 2028

2029
List of Australian films of 2029

2020s
Australian
 Films